Livonia is a genus of medium-sized Indo-Pacific predatory sea snails, marine gastropod mollusks in the family Volutidae, the volutes. 

The genus belongs to the clade Livoniini, which is usually placed in the subfamily Cymbiinae (but sometimes in the Fulgorariinae instead).

Species
Species within the genus Livonia include:
Livonia joerinkensi (Poppe, 1987)
Livonia limpusi Bail, 1999
Livonia mammilla (G. B. Sowerby I, 1844)
 Livonia mervcooperi Bail & Limpus, 2010
Livonia nodiplicata (Cox, 1910)
Livonia roadnightae (McCoy, 1881)
Synonyms
 Livonia quisqualis Iredale, 1957: synonym of Livonia roadnightae (McCoy, 1881)

References

 Bail, P.; Poppe, G.T. (2001). A conchological iconography: a taxonomic introduction of the recent Volutidae. ConchBooks, Hackenheim. 30 pp, 5 pl.

External links
 Iredale, T. (1934). Two new generic names for South Australian marine Mollusca. The South Australian Naturalist. 15(2): 57-58

Volutidae